The term Orthodox Christianity in Iraq may refer to:

 Eastern Orthodox Christianity in Iraq, representing communities and institutions of Eastern Orthodox Church, in Iraq
 Oriental Orthodox Christianity in Iraq, representing communities and institutions of Oriental Orthodox Church, in Iraq

See also
 Orthodox Christianity (disambiguation)
 Orthodoxy in Iraq (disambiguation)
 Iraq (disambiguation)